Malacca Botanical Garden (Malay: Taman Botanikal Melaka) is a botanical garden located in Ayer Keroh, Malacca, Malaysia. It was established in April 1984 as Ayer Keroh Recreational Forest, and got its present name on 1 June 2006. Recreational facilities here include the Malacca Forestry Museum, Malaysia Book Village, Prehistoric Garden, the Storyland, children's playgrounds, the Orang Asli Park, Deer Park, suspension bridge, watch towers and beautiful picnic spots. It spans over 359 hectares and as much as 10 hectares is used for a camping spot.

See also
 List of tourist attractions in Malacca
 Penang Botanic Gardens

References

External links 

 Virtual Malaysia
 This place on a map

1984 establishments in Malaysia
Ayer Keroh
Botanical gardens in Malaysia
Geography of Malacca
Tourist attractions in Malacca